"Tiago" is a song by Kendji Girac. It was released as the third single of his album Amigo.

Charts

References

2018 songs
2018 singles
Kendji Girac songs
French-language songs